The South American Youth Championship 1995 was held in Cochabamba, La Paz and Santa Cruz, Bolivia. It also served as qualification for the 1995 FIFA World Youth Championship.

Teams
The following teams entered the tournament:

 
  (host)
 
 
 
 
 
 
 
(Uruguay were banned by the FIFA due to misbehaviour at the previous World Youth Championship)

Venues 
 Estadio Hernando Siles, La Paz 
 Estadio Félix Capriles, Cochabamba 
 Estadio Jesús Bermúdez, Oruro
 Estadio Ramón Tahuichi Aguilera, Santa Cruz de la Sierra

First round

Group A

Group B

Final round

Qualification to World Youth Championship
The three best performing teams qualified for the 1995 FIFA World Youth Championship.

External links
Results by RSSSF

South American Youth Championship
1995 in youth association football